Philosophical anthropology, sometimes called anthropological philosophy, is a discipline dealing with questions of metaphysics and phenomenology of the human person.

History
Plato identified the human essence with the soul, affiriming that the material body is its prison from which the soul yearnes for to be liberated because it wants to see, know and contemplate the pure hyperuranic ideas. According to the Phaedrus, after death, souls transmigrate from a body to another. Therefore Plato introduced an irreducible mind–body dualism.

Aristotle defined the man as the union of two substances, the body and the soul, within the socalled theory of hylomorphism. Man is a type of animal with a specific characteristic that makes him superior than any other living entity: it is the rational soul. The soul is not something of extraneous to the body, but it is the principle that organizes, structures, gives life and form to the body's matter. The Aristotelian soul's conception is described in the threaty On the Soul from a theoretical point of view, and in the Politics and Nicomachean Ethics from a practical one.

The Christian thought developed the concept of creatio ex nihilo according to which all what exists is a contingent creature of God, including matter. The Platonic khôra ended to be a region out of the Logos' power.

Time started to be conceived within a linear and not yet a cyclic becoming.

Christianity also developed the notion of person in order to explain the Most Holy Trinity and the co-existence of the human and divine nature (essence) in the unique person of Christ.

Ancient Christian writers: Augustine of Hippo

Augustine of Hippo was one of the first Christian ancient Latin authors with a very clear anthropological vision, although it is not clear if he had any influence on Max Scheler, the founder of philosophical anthropology as an independent discipline, nor on any of the major philosophers that followed him. Augustine has been cited by Husserl and Heidegger as one of the early writers to inquire on time-consciousness and the role of seeing in the feeling of "Being-in-the-world".

Augustine saw the human being as a perfect unity of two substances: soul and body. He was much closer in this anthropological view to Aristotle than to Plato. In his late treatise On Care to Be Had for the Dead sec. 5 (420 AD) he insisted that the body is essential part of the human person:

Augustine's favourite figure to describe body-soul unity is marriage: caro tua, coniux tua – your body is your wife. Initially, the two elements were in perfect harmony. After the fall of humanity they are now experiencing dramatic combat between one another.

They are two categorically different things: the body is a three-dimensional object composed of the four elements, whereas the soul has no spatial dimensions. Soul is a kind of substance, participating in reason, fit for ruling the body. Augustine was not preoccupied, as Plato and Descartes were, with going too much into detail in his efforts to explain the metaphysics of the soul-body union. It sufficed for him to admit that they were metaphysically distinct. To be a human is to be a composite of soul and body, and that the soul is superior to the body. The latter statement is grounded in his hierarchical classification of things into those that merely exist, those that exist and live, and those that exist, live, and have intelligence or reason.

According to N. Blasquez, Augustine's dualism of substances of the body and soul doesn't stop him from seeing the unity of body and soul as a substance itself. Following Aristotle and other ancient philosophers, he defined man as a rational mortal animal – animal rationale mortale. Augustine also believed in the otherworldly Life of the soul and in the final resurrection of the flesh.

Modern period
Philosophical anthropology as a kind of thought, before it was founded as a distinct philosophical discipline in the 1920s, emerged as post-medieval thought striving for emancipation from Christian religion and Aristotelic tradition. The origin of this liberation, characteristic of modernity, has been the Cartesian skepticism formulated by Descartes in the first two of his Meditations on First Philosophy (1641).

Immanuel Kant (1724–1804) taught the first lectures on anthropology in the European academic world. He specifically developed a conception of pragmatic anthropology, according to which the human being is studied as a free agent. At the same time, he conceived of his anthropology as an empirical, not a strictly philosophical discipline. Both his philosophical and his anthropological work has been one of the influences in the field during the 19th and 20th century. After Kant, Ludwig Feuerbach is sometimes considered the next most important influence and founder of anthropological philosophy.

During the 19th century, an important contribution came from post-Kantian German idealists like Fichte, Schelling and Hegel, as well from Søren Kierkegaard.

Philosophical anthropology as independent discipline 
Since its development in the 1920s, in the milieu of Germany Weimar culture, philosophical anthropology has been turned into a philosophical discipline, competing with the other traditional sub-disciplines of philosophy such as epistemology, ethics, metaphysics, logic, and aesthetics. It is the attempt to unify disparate ways of understanding behaviour of humans as both creatures of their social environments and creators of their own values. Although the majority of philosophers throughout the history of philosophy can be said to have a distinctive "anthropology" that undergirds their thought, philosophical anthropology itself, as a specific discipline in philosophy, arose within the later modern period as an outgrowth from developing methods in philosophy, such as phenomenology and existentialism. The former, which draws its energy from methodical reflection on human experience (first person perspective) as from the philosopher's own personal experience, naturally aided the emergence of philosophical explorations of human nature and the human condition.

1920s Germany
Max Scheler, from 1900 until 1920 had been a follower of Husserl's phenomenology, the hegemonic form of philosophy in Germany at the time. Scheler sought to apply Husserl's phenomenological approach to different topics. From 1920 Scheler laid the foundation for philosophical anthropology as a philosophical discipline, competing with phenomenology and other philosophic disciplines. Husserl and Martin Heidegger (1889–1976), were the two most authoritative philosophers in Germany at the time, and their criticism to philosophical anthropology and Scheler have had a major impact on the discipline.

Scheler defined the human being not so much as a "rational animal" (as has traditionally been the case since Aristotle) but essentially as a "loving being". He breaks down the traditional hylomorphic conception of the human person, and describes the personal being with a tripartite structure of lived body, soul, and spirit. Love and hatred are not psychological emotions, but spiritual, intentional acts of the person, which he categorises as "intentional feelings." Scheler based his philosophical anthropology in a Christian metaphysics of the spirit. Helmuth Plessner would later emancipate philosophical anthropology from Christianity.

Helmuth Plessner and Arnold Gehlen have been influenced by Scheler, and they are the three major representatives of philosophical anthropology as a movement.

From the 1940s
Ernst Cassirer, a neo-Kantian philosopher, was the most influential source for the definition and development of the field from the 1940s until the 1960s. Particularly influential has been Cassirer's description of man as a symbolic animal, which has been reprised in the 1960s by Gilbert Durand, scholar of symbolic anthropology and the imaginary.

In 1953, future pope Karol Wojtyla based his dissertation thesis on Max Scheler, limiting himself to the works Scheler wrote before rejecting Catholicism and the Judeo-Christian tradition in 1920. Wojtyla used Scheler as an example that phenomenology could be reconciled with Catholicism. Some authors have argued that Wojtyla influenced philosophical anthropology.

In the 20th century, other important contributors and influences to philosophical anthropology were Paul Häberlin (1878–1960), Martin Buber (1878–1965), E.R. Dodds (1893–1979), Hans-Georg Gadamer (1900–2002), Eric Voegelin (1901–85), Hans Jonas (1903–93), Josef Pieper (1904–97), Hans-Eduard Hengstenberg (1904–98), Jean-Paul Sartre (1905–80), Joseph Maréchal (1878–1944), Maurice Merleau-Ponty (1908–61), Paul Ricoeur (1913–2005), René Girard (1923–2015), Alasdair MacIntyre (1929–), Pierre Bourdieu (1930–2002), Hans Blumenberg, Jacques Derrida (1930–2004), Emerich Coreth (1919–2006), Leonardo Polo (1926–2013), and, importantly, P. M. S. Hacker (1939- ).

Anthropology of interpersonal relationships
A large focus of philosophical anthropology is also interpersonal relationships, as an attempt to unify disparate ways of understanding the behaviour of humans as both creatures of their social environments and creators of their own values. It analyses also the ontology that is in play in human relationships – of which intersubjectivity is a major theme. Intersubjectivity is the study of how two individuals, subjects, whose experiences and interpretations of the world are radically different understand and relate to each other.

Recently anthropology has begun to shift towards studies of intersubjectivity and other existential/phenomenological themes. Studies of language have also gained new prominence in philosophy and sociology due to language's close ties with the question of intersubjectivity.

Michael D. Jackson's study of intersubjectivity
The academic Michael D. Jackson is another important philosophical anthropologist. His research and fieldwork concentrate on existential themes of "being in the world" (Dasein) as well as interpersonal relationships. His methodology challenges traditional anthropology due to its focus on first-person experience. In his most well known book, Minima Ethnographica which focuses on intersubjectivity and interpersonal relationships, he draws upon his ethnographic fieldwork in order to explore existential theory.

In his latest book, Existential Anthropology, he explores the notion of control, stating that humans anthropomorphize inanimate objects around them in order to enter into an interpersonal relationship with them. In this way humans are able to feel as if they have control over situations that they cannot control because rather than treating the object as an object, they treat it as if it is a rational being capable of understanding their feelings and language. Good examples are prayer to gods to alleviate drought or to help a sick person or cursing at a computer that has ceased to function.

P. M. S. Hacker's Tetraology on Human Nature

A foremost Wittgensteinian, P. M. S. Hacker has recently completed a tetralogy in philosophical anthropology: “The first was Human Nature: The Categorical Framework (2007), which provided the stage set.  The second was The Intellectual Powers: A Study of Human Nature (2013), which began the play with the presentation of the intellect and its courtiers.  The third The Passions: A Study of Human Nature (2017), which introduced the drama of the passions and the emotions.  The fourth and final volume, The Moral Powers: A Study of Human Nature (2020), turns to the moral powers and the will, to good and evil, to pleasure and happiness, to what gives meaning to our lives, and the place of death in our lives. 
This tetralogy constitutes a Summa Anthropologica in as much as it presents a systematic categorical overview of our thought and talk of human nature, ranging from substance, power, and causation to good and evil and the meaning of life.  A sine qua non of any philosophical investigation, according to Grice, is a synopsis of the relevant logico-linguistic grammar.  It is surely unreasonable that each generation should have to amass afresh these grammatical norms of conceptual exclusion, implication, compatibility, and contextual presupposition, as well as tense and person anomalies and asymmetries.  So via the tetralogy I have attempted to provide a compendium of usage of the pertinent categories in philosophical anthropology to assist others in their travels through these landscapes.”

See also

 List of important publications in anthropology
 Antihumanism (opposite)
 Ernst Tugendhat (2007) Anthropologie statt Metaphysik
 Introduction to Kant's Anthropology
 Martin Buber 
 Philosophical Anthropology Info – names, books

Notes

References

Bibliography
 
 
 Blasquez, N, El concepto del substantia segun san Agustin, "Augustinus" 14 (1969), pp. 305–350; 15 (1970), pp. 369–383; 16 (1971), pp. 69–79.
 Cassirer, Ernst (1944) An Essay on Man
 Couturier Charles SJ, (1954) La structure métaphysique de l'homme d'après saint Augustin, in: Augustinus Magister, Congrès International Augustinien. Communications, Paris, vol. 1, pp. 543–550
 Donceel, Joseph F., Philosophical Anthropology, New York: Sheed&Ward 1967.
 Gilson, Étienne, (1955) History of Christian Philosophy in the Middle Ages, (2nd ed., reprinted 1985), London: Sheed & Ward, pp. 829, .
 Fischer, Joachim (2006) Der Identitätskern der Philosophischen Anthropologie (Scheler, Plessner, Gehlen) in Krüger, Hans-Peter and Lindemann, Gesa (2006) Philosophische Anthropologie im 21. Jahrhundert
 Fikentscher, Wolfgang (2004) Modes of thought: a study in the anthropology of law and religion
 Gianni, A., (1965) Il problema antropologico, Roma .
 Hendrics, E. (1954) Platonisches und Biblisches Denken bei Augustinus, in: Augustinus Magister, Congrès International Augustinien. Communications, Paris, vol. 1.
 
 Lucas Lucas, Ramon, Man Incarnate Spirit, a Philosophy of Man Compendium, USA: Circle Press, 2005.
 Mann, W.E., Inner-Life Ethics, in:
 Masutti, Egidio, (1989), Il problema del corpo in San Agostino, Roma: Borla, p. 230, 
 Mondin, Battista, Philosophical Anthropology, Man: an Impossible Project?, Rome: Urbaniana University Press, 1991.
 Pulina Giuseppe, Dizionario di antropologia filosofica, Diogene Multimedia, Bologna 2022.
 Thomas Sturm, Kant und die Wissenschaften vom Menschen. Paderborn: Mentis, 2009. , 9783897856080
 Jesús Padilla Gálvez, Philosophical Anthropology. Wittgenstein’s Perspective. Berlin,  De Gruyter, 2010.  Review

Further reading

 Joseph Agassi, Towards a Rational Philosophical Anthropology. The Hague, 1977.
 Anicius Manlius Severinus Boethius, The Consolation of Philosophy, Chicago: The Great Books foundation 1959.
 Martin Buber, I and Thou, New York: Scribners 1970.
 Martin Buber, The Knowledge of Man: A Philosophy of the Interhuman, New York: Harper&Row 1965.
 Martin Buber, Between Man and Man, New York: Macmillan 1965.
 Albert Camus, The Rebel: An Essay on Man in Revolt, New York: Vintage Books 1956.
 Charles Darwin, The Origin of Species by Means of Natural Selection, Chicago – London: Encyclopædia Britannica 1952.
 Teilhard de Chardin, The Phenomenon of Man, New York: Harper&Row 1965
 Jacques Derrida, l'Ecriture et la Difference
 Joachim Fischer, Philosophische Anthropologie. Eine Denkrichtung des 20. Jahrhunderts. Freiburg, 2008.
 Sigmund Freud, Three Essays on the Theory of Sexuality, New York: Basic Books 1975.
 Erich Fromm, To Have or To Be, New York: Harper&Row 1976.
 David Hume, A Treatise of Human Nature
 Hans Jonas, The Phenomenon of Life. Chicago, 1966.
 Søren Kierkegaard, The Sickness unto Death. 1848.
 Hans Köchler, Der innere Bezug von Anthropologie und Ontologie. Das Problem der Anthropologie im Denken Martin Heideggers. Hain: Meisenheim a.G., 1974.
 Hans Köchler, "The Relation between Man and World. A Transcendental-anthropological Problem," in: Analecta Husserliana, Vol. 14 (1983), pp. 181–186.
 Stanislaw Kowalczyk, An Outline of the Philosophical Anthropology. Frankfurt a.M. etc., 1991.
 Michael Jackson, Minima Ethnographica and Existential Anthropology
 Michael Landmann, Philosophische Anthropologie. Menschliche Selbstdeutung in Geschichte und Gegenwart. Berlin, 3rd ed., 1969.
 Claude Lévi-Strauss, Anthropologie structurale. Paris, 1958.
 John Locke, An Essay Concerning Human Understanding, New York: Dover Publication 1959 (vol. I-II).
 Bernard Lonergan, Insight: A Study on Human Understanding, New York-London: Philosophical Library-Longmans 1958.
 Alasdair MacIntyre, Dependent Rational Animals. 1999.
 Gabriel Marcel, Homo Viator: Introduction to a Metaphysics of Hope, London: Harper&Row, 1962.
 Gabriel Marcel, Problematic Man, New York: Herder and Herder 1967.
 Maurice Merleau-Ponty, La Phenomenologie de la Perception
 Herbert Marcuse, One Dimensional Man, Boston: Beacon Press 1966.
 Jacques Maritain, Existence and Existent: An Essay on Christian Existentialism, Garden City: Image Books 1957.
 Gerhard Medicus, Being Human – Bridging the Gap between the Sciences of Body and Mind. Berlin: VWB 2015, .
 Maurice Nédoncelle, Love and the Person, New York: Sheed & Ward 1966.
 Josef Pieper, Happiness and Contemplation. New York:Pantheon, 1958.
 Josef Pieper, "Josef Pieper: An Anthology. San Francisco:Ignatius Press, 1989.
 Josef Pieper, Death and Immortality. New York:Herder & Herder, 1969.
 Josef Pieper, "Faith, Hope, Love". Ignatius Press; New edition, 1997.
 Josef Pieper, The Four Cardinal Virtues: Prudence, Justice, Fortitude, Temperance. Notre Dame, Ind., 1966.
 Leonardo Polo, Antropología Trascendental: la persona humana. 1999.
 Leonardo Polo, Antropología Trascendental: la esencia de la persona humana. 2003.
 Karl Rahner, Spirit in the World, New York: Herder and Herder, 1968.
 Karl Rahner, Hearer of the Word Karl Rahner, Hominisation: The Evolutionary Origin of Man as a Theological Problem, New York: Herder and Herder 1965.
 Marc Rölli, Anthropologie dekolonisieren, Frankfurt, New York: Campus 2021. 
 Paul Ricoeur, Soi-meme comme un autre Paul Ricoeur, Fallible Man: Philosophy of Will, Chicago: Henry Regnery Company 1967.
 Paul Ricoeur, Freedom and Nature: The Voluntary and Involuntary, Evanston: Northwestern University Press 1966.
 Jean-Paul Sartre, Being and Nothingness: An Essay in Phenomenological Ontology, New York: The Citadel Press 1956.
 Jean-Paul Sartre, Existentialism and Humanism, New York: Haskell House Publisher 1948.
 Jean-Paul Sartre, Nausea, New York: New Directions 1959.
 Martti Olavi Siirala, Medicine in Metamorphosis Routledge 2003.
 Baruch Spinoza, Ethics, Indianapolis: Hackett 1998.
 Eric Voegelin, Anamnesis.
 Karol Wojtyla, The Acting Person, Dordrecht-Boston: Reidel Publishing Company 1979.
 Karol Wojtyla, Love and Responsibility'', London-Glasgow: Collins, 1981.

 
Philosophy of social science